North Fork Creek is a tributary of Redbank Creek in northwest Pennsylvania in the United States. It is formed by the confluence of Muddy Run and Williams Run in Polk Township, Jefferson County.

North Fork Creek and Sandy Lick Creek join to form Redbank Creek in the borough of Brookville, Jefferson County.

Political subdivisions
The political subdivisions North Fork Creek traverses, given in the order they are encountered traveling downstream, are as follows:

Polk Township
Warsaw Township
Eldred Township
Pine Creek Township
Rose Township
Brookville

Tributaries
The named tributaries of North Fork Creek, given in the order they are encountered traveling downstream, are as follows:

Williams Run
Muddy Run
Bearpen Run
Manners Dam Run
Hetrick Run
Lucas Run
South Branch North Fork Redbank Creek
Acy Run
Seneca Run
Windfall Run
Clear Run
Tarkiln Run
Shippen Run
Craft Run
Burns Run
Red Lick Run
Yeomans Run
Sugarcamp Run
Sugar Camp Run
Brookville Reservoir
Brookville Waterworks Dam

See also

 Tributaries of the Allegheny River
 List of rivers of Pennsylvania
 List of tributaries of the Allegheny River

References

Rivers of Pennsylvania
Tributaries of the Allegheny River
Rivers of Jefferson County, Pennsylvania